Stephen Van Rensselaer Trowbridge (January 1, 1855April 19, 1891) was a Michigan lawyer.

Early life
Trowbridge was born in Bloomfield, Michigan on January 1, 1855 to parents Rowland Ebenezer and Mary Ann Trowbrige.

Education
Trowbridge attended the University of Michigan with the class of 1876, but he left the college in the fall of his senior year, and started to study law with the firm Morse & Wilson in Ionia, Michigan from 1877 to 1879.

Career
After studying law with Morse & Wilson, Trowbridge began practicing law in Ionia. Trowbridge was the prosecuting attorney for Ionia County from 1881 to 1882. Trowbridge was elected to the position of Michigan Attorney General in 1889 and resigned from the position on May 25, 1890 due to his poor health.

Death
Trowbridge died in Birmingham, Michigan on April 19, 1891.

References

1855 births
1891 deaths
Michigan lawyers
Michigan Attorneys General
University of Michigan alumni
20th-century American politicians
20th-century American lawyers
19th-century American lawyers